"The Lion Sleeps Tonight" is a song originally written and recorded by Solomon Linda under the title "Mbube" for the South African Gallo Record Company in 1939. Linda's original was written in isiZulu, while the English version's lyrics were written by George David Weiss.

The song was adapted and covered internationally by many pop and folk revival artists in the 1950s and 1960s. It was recorded as "Wimoweh" by the Weavers in November 1951, and published by Folkways Music Publishers in December 1951. Artists who recorded various versions of the song included Henri Salvador, Karl Denver, Jimmy Dorsey, Yma Sumac, Noro Morales, Miriam Makeba, and the Kingston Trio.

In 1961, a version adapted into English with the title "The Lion Sleeps Tonight" by the doo-wop group the Tokens became a number-one hit in the United States. It went on to earn millions in royalties from cover versions and film licensing.  The pop group Tight Fit had a number one hit in the UK with the song in 1982. This song is written and composed in the key of F♯ major.

History

"Mbube" (Zulu for "lion") was written by Solomon Linda, a South African Zulu singer, who worked for the Gallo Record Company in Johannesburg as a cleaner and record packer. He spent his weekends performing with the Evening Birds, a musical ensemble, and it was at Gallo Records, under the direction of producer Griffiths Motsieloa, that Linda and his fellow musicians recorded several songs, including "Mbube", which incorporated a call-response pattern common among many Sub-Saharan African ethnic groups, including the Zulu.

According to journalist Rian Malan:

"Mbube" wasn't the most remarkable tune, but there was something compelling about the underlying chant, a dense meshing of low male voices above which Solomon yodelled and howled for two exhilarating minutes, improvising occasionally. The third take was the best, achieving immortality when Solly took a deep breath, opened his mouth, and improvised the melody that the world now associates with these words:

In the jungle, the mighty jungle, the lion sleeps tonight.

Issued by Gallo as a 78-rpm phonograph record in 1939, and marketed to black audiences, "Mbube" became a hit and Linda a star throughout South Africa. By 1948, the song had sold over 100,000 copies in Africa and among black South African immigrants in Great Britain. Linda's song also gave the name to a style of African a cappella music that evolved into isicathamiya (also called mbube), popularized by Ladysmith Black Mambazo.

In 1949, Alan Lomax, then working as folk music director for Decca Records, brought Solomon Linda's 78 recording to the attention of his friend Pete Seeger of the folk group The Weavers. In November 1951, after having performed the song for at least a year in their concerts, The Weavers recorded an adapted version with brass and string orchestra and chorus and released it as a 78 single titled "Wimoweh", a mishearing of the original song's chorus of "Uyimbube" ("You are a lion" in Zulu). Their version contained the chanting chorus "Wimoweh" and Linda's improvised melodic line. The Weavers credited the song as "Traditional", with arrangement by "Paul Campbell", later found to be a pseudonym used by the Weavers in order to claim royalties. It reached Billboards top ten and became a staple of The Weavers' live repertoire, achieving further exposure on their best-selling The Weavers at Carnegie Hall LP album, recorded in 1955 and issued in 1957. The song was also covered extensively by other folk revival groups such as The Kingston Trio, and exotica singer Yma Sumac. However, Miriam Makeba, in 1960, recorded the same song as "Mbube", with the writing credit given to "J. Linda".

In 1961, two RCA Records producers, Hugo Peretti and Luigi Creatore, hired Juilliard-trained musician and lyricist George David Weiss to arrange a Doo-wop and Rhythm & blues cover of "Wimoweh" for the B-side of a 45-rpm single called "Tina", sung by group The Tokens. Weiss wrote the English lines "In the jungle, the mighty jungle, The lion sleeps tonight ..." and "Hush, my darling, don't fear, my darling ..."

Weiss also brought in soprano Anita Darian to reprise Yma Sumac's version, before, during and after the soprano saxophone solo. "The Lion Sleeps Tonight" was issued by RCA in 1961, and it rocketed to number one on the Billboard Hot 100. Weiss's Abilene Music Inc. was the publisher of this arrangement, and listed "Albert Stanton" (a pseudonym for Al Brackman, the business partner of Pete Seeger's music publisher, Howie Richmond) as one of the song's writers or arrangers.

Copyright issues
Social historian Ronald D. Cohen writes, "Howie Richmond copyrighted many songs originally in the public domain but now slightly revised to satisfy Decca and also to reap profits."  Howie Richmond's claim of author's copyright could secure both the songwriter's royalties and his company's publishing share of the song's earnings.

Although Linda was listed as a performer on the record itself, the Weavers thought they had recorded a traditional Zulu song. Their managers, publisher, and their attorneys knew otherwise because they had been contacted by— and had reached an agreement with— Eric Gallo of Gallo Records in South Africa. The Americans maintained, however, that South African copyrights were not valid because South Africa was not a signatory to U.S. copyright law. In the 1950s, after Linda's authorship was made clear, Seeger sent Linda $1000.   Seeger also said he instructed TRO/Folkways to henceforth pay his share of authors' earnings to Linda. The folksinger apparently trusted his publisher's word of honor and either saw no need, or was unable to make sure these instructions were carried out.

In 2000, South African journalist Rian Malan wrote a feature article for Rolling Stone magazine in which he recounted Linda's story and estimated that the song had earned $15 million for its use in the Disney movie The Lion King alone. The piece prompted filmmaker François Verster to create the Emmy-winning documentary A Lion's Trail, that told Linda's story while incidentally exposing the workings of the multi-million dollar corporate music publishing industry.
In 2003 a CGI animation was released with Pat & Stan. It marked the two's debut appearance and was the pilot episode to ITV's shorts and the TV series sketch of the same name.

In July 2004, as a result of the publicity generated by Malan's article and the subsequent documentary, the song became the subject of a lawsuit between Linda's estate and Disney, claiming that Disney owed $1.6 million in royalties for the use of "The Lion Sleeps Tonight" in the film and musical stage productions of The Lion King. At the same time, the Richmond Organization began to pay $3,000 annually into Linda's estate. In February 2006, Linda's descendants reached a legal settlement with Abilene Music Publishers, who held the worldwide rights and had licensed the song to Disney, to place the earnings of the song in a trust.

The copyright issues were updated in the 2018 TV movie, "Remastered: The Lion's Share".

In 2012, "Mbube" fell into the public domain, owing to the copyright law of South Africa. "The Lion Sleeps Tonight", however, is still in copyright.

Selected list of recorded versions

The song has been recorded by numerous artists, and is a standard that has become a part of popular culture.

"Mbube"
 1939 Solomon Linda and the Evening Birds
 1939 Solomon Linda and the Evening Birds (take 2) featured in the first film adaptation of Cry, the Beloved Country
 1960 Miriam Makeba, on Miriam Makeba
 1988 Ladysmith Black Mambazo, as "Mbube", during opening sequence of movie Coming to America (but not on the soundtrack album)
 1991 The Elite Swingsters Featuring Dolly Rathebe, as "Mbube" on Woza!
 1994 Ladysmith Black Mambazo, as "Mbube (The Lion Sleeps Tonight)", on Gift of the Tortoise
 1996 Soweto String Quartet, as "Imbube" on Renaissance
 2005 Soweto Gospel Choir, as "Imbube" on Blessed
 2006 Ladysmith Black Mambazo, as "Mbube", on Long Walk to Freedom
 2007 CH2 and Soweto String Quartet, as "Imbube" on Pap & Paella
 2010 Angélique Kidjo, as "Mbube" on Õÿö
 2019 Lebo M, on the soundtrack of the computer-animated remake of The Lion King
 2020 Mahotella Queens, BokkieULT, Cuebur, as "Mbube 2020"

"Wimoweh"
 1952: The Weavers: US No. 6
 1952: Jimmy Dorsey
 1952: Yma Sumac
 1957: The Weavers, live.
 1957: The Georgetown Chimes on album Under the Tree with the Georgetown Chimes
 1959: Bill Hayes (on Kapp Records)
 1959: The Kingston Trio
 1961: Karl Denver: UK No. 4
 1962: Bert Kaempfert on album A Swingin' Safari, (on Polydor Records). Done mostly as an instrumental save for the "Wimoweh" chorus.
 1962: Hugh Masekela on Trumpet Africaine
 1964: Glen Campbell on The Astounding 12-String Guitar of Glen Campbell
 1964: Chet Atkins
 1971: Rumplestiltskin on Black Magician
 1975: Bamses Venner
 1993: Nanci Griffith with Odetta, on Other Voices, Other Rooms
 1994: Roger Whittaker, on Roger Whittaker Live!
 1994: Manu Dibango and Ladysmith Black Mambazo, on Waka Afrika
 1998: Pete Seeger on For Kids And Just Plain Folks
 1999: Desmond Dekker on Halfway To Paradise

"The Lion Sleeps Tonight"

 1961: The Tokens: US No. 1, UK No. 11, Canada No. 1
 1962: Henri Salvador – in French as "Le lion est mort ce soir" ("The Lion Died Tonight") FR No. 1
 1965: The New Christy Minstrels
 1965: The Shangaans, on "Jungle Drums"
 1966: The Townsmen, No. 70 Canada
 1967: The Hounds (Swedish Popgroup)
 1968: The Tremeloes, on Silence Is Golden
 1971: Eric Donaldson
 1972: Robert John: US No. 3, gold record / Can No. 15
 1972: Dave Newman: UK No. 34
 1974: Ras Michael and the Sons of Negus, as "Rise Jah Jah Children (The Lion Sleeps)"
 1975: Brian Eno, on single, later on Working Backwards: 1983-1973 and Eno Box II: Vocal
 1976: Dove
 1979: The Stylistics
 1980: Passengers
 1982: Tight Fit: UK No. 1, This version has sold over a million copies in the UK. 
 1982: The Nylons No. 91 Canada
 1982: Maria Conchita Alonso
 1990: Ladysmith Black Mambazo with The Mint Juleps, on Spike Lee & Company: Do It a Cappella PBS documentary and album
 1991: Hotline & P.J. Powers, on The Best Of
 1991: Big Daddy, mashed up with "Welcome to the Jungle"
 1992: Talisman, on A Capella
 1992: They Might Be Giants with Laura Cantrell, interpolated into "The Guitar (The Lion Sleeps Tonight)"
 1993: Pow woW: FR No. 1, cover of Salvador's version.
 1993: R.E.M.: B-side of "The Sidewinder Sleeps Tonite" and on The Automatic Box (Disc 3).
 1993: The Nylons
 1994: Dennis Marcellino
 1994: Tonic Sol-Fa
 1995: Lebo M. for Rhythm of the Pride Lands, an album with songs inspired by the music of The Lion King
 1997: 'N Sync: B-side of "For the Girl Who Has Everything"
 1998: The Undertones, on 8 Degrees and Rising
 1990s: Streetnix
 2001: Baha Men featuring Imani Coppola, sampled the chorus in the song "You All Dat" on Who Let the Dogs Out
 2001: Rockapella
 2002: Mango Groove, on Eat a Mango
 2004: Daniel Küblböck
 2005: The Mavericks
2006: VeggieTales characters, on Bob and Larry Sing the 70s
 2009: Melo-M, on Around the World
 2010: Cool Down Cafe featuring Gerard Joling, on Goud
 2014: Billy Joel and Jimmy Fallon, on The Tonight Show Starring Jimmy Fallon
 2015: Justin Fletcher as Gail Force on Gigglebiz
 2016: Tight Fit new production Rainforest Radio Edit on Together (Almighty)
 2019: Billy Eichner and Seth Rogen, on The Lion King film and soundtrack
 2019: Wiese (music producer)

"The Lion Sleeps Tonight (Wimoweh)"
1997: Barbados (Swedish Dansband)

Charted singles

The Tokens

Weekly charts

Year-end charts

Robert John

Weekly charts

Year-end charts

Tight Fit

Weekly charts

Year-end charts

R.E.M.

Weekly charts

Year-end charts

References

External links
 "Solomon Linda, Songwriter Who Penned 'The Lion,' Finally Gets His Just Desserts"
 Sample of "Mbube" performed by Solomon Linda's Original Evening Birds (WMA Stream).
 "Family of 'Lion Sleeps Tonight' Writer to Get Millions": All Things Considered, NPR
 "Penniless singer's family sue Disney for Lion King royalties": Daily Telegraph
 The Lion Sleeps Tonight. BBC World Service documentary by Paul Gambaccini first broadcast 16 July 2010, archived
 200+ recordings of Mbube/Wimoweh/The Lion Sleeps Tonight on FLORENCOM's YouTube tribute channel
 "The Money Show" May 6, 2021 episode of Afropop Worldwide, which includes a history of "Mbube"/"The Lion Sleeps Tonight"
Video comparing "Mbube" and "The Lion Sleeps Tonight" on VYIMBVBE's YouTube tribute channel

1961 singles
1972 singles
1982 singles
Billboard Hot 100 number-one singles
Cashbox number-one singles
Doo-wop songs
Miriam Makeba songs
Nanci Griffith songs
Glen Campbell songs
Henri Salvador songs
European Hot 100 Singles number-one singles
Dutch Top 40 number-one singles
UK Singles Chart number-one singles
Robert John songs
Song recordings produced by Hugo & Luigi
Song recordings produced by Tim Friese-Greene
Songs written by Hugo Peretti
Songs written by Luigi Creatore
Songs written by George David Weiss
South African songs
1939 songs
RCA Victor singles
Atlantic Records singles
Jive Records singles
The Tokens songs
Internet memes introduced in 2019
Lions in popular culture